The UEFA play-offs of the 2023 FIFA Women's World Cup qualification competition involved the runners-up from all nine groups in the group stage.

The play-offs consisted of two rounds of single-leg ties. The two best play-off winners, the Republic of Ireland and Switzerland, qualified for the 2023 FIFA Women's World Cup, while the third winner, Portugal, advanced to the inter-confederation play-offs.

Ranking of second-placed teams
Because some groups had six teams and others had five, matches against the sixth place team in each group are discounted. As a result, eight matches played by each team are counted for the purposes of determining the ranking.

Draw

The draw took place on 9 September 2022 at 13:30 CEST. The nine teams were drawn into six ties without any seeding, with the first team drawn in each tie to be the home team of the single-leg matches.

Round 1: The worst six runners-up will enter in round 1 and were drawn into three ties.
Round 2: The best three runners-up will enter in round 2 and, together with the three winners of round 1, were drawn into three ties.

Bracket

Round 1
Times are CEST (UTC+2), as listed by UEFA (local times, if different, are in parentheses).

Summary

The single-leg matches were played on 6 October 2022.

|}

Matches

Round 2

Summary

The single-leg matches were played on 11 October 2022.

|}

Matches

Ranking of play-off winners

To rank the three play-off winners, their results in their respective groups and round 2 of the play-offs were combined. As some groups had five teams and others had six, any group matches against teams who finished sixth in their groups were discounted; also, as not all teams played in both play-off rounds, results in round 1 of play-offs were not counted either. As a result, nine matches played by each team (eight in the group stage and one in round 2 of the play-offs) were counted for the purposes of determining the ranking. The two higher-placed winners qualified for the Women's World Cup and the lowest-placed winner advanced to the inter-confederation play-offs.

Goalscorers

References

External links
FIFA Women's World Cup, UEFA.com

Play-offs
FIFA Women's World Cup qualification - UEFA play-offs